This is a listing of the horses that finished in either first, second, or third place and the number of starters in the Breeders' Cup Juvenile Turf, a grade two race run on grass on Friday of the Breeders' Cup World Thoroughbred Championships. The race was upgraded to GI status from 2011.

References
 Breeders' Cup official website

Juvenile Turf
Lists of horse racing results